Pseudasthenes is a genus of small suboscine passerine birds, commonly known as canasteros or false canasteros, in the ovenbird family. It was described in 2010 to accommodate four species split from the related genus Asthenes. The genus is endemic to South America.

Species
The four species in the genus are:
 Dusky-tailed canastero, Pseudasthenes humicola
 Patagonian canastero, Pseudasthenes patagonica
 Steinbach's canastero, Pseudasthenes steinbachi
 Cactus canastero, Pseudasthenes cactorum

References

 
Bird genera